"Seaside Woman" is a 1977 single by Wings released under the pseudonym Suzy and the Red Stripes. It charted at #59 in the US and in the UK at #90 in 1986.

History
"Seaside Woman" was the first song Linda McCartney wrote by herself, in response to a lawsuit by Northern Songs and Maclen Music alleging Paul had violated an exclusive rights agreement by claiming to collaborate with Linda on the song "Another Day".  The collaboration had the effect of transferring a 50% share of the publishing royalties to his own McCartney Music company. 
According to a 1974 interview with Linda, she wrote the song during a McCartney family visit to Jamaica in 1971 "when ATV was suing us saying I was incapable of writing, so Paul said, 'Get out and write a song.'" The lawsuit, which alleged that Linda's co-writing credits were inauthentic and that she was not a real songwriter, was "amicably settled," according to an ATV spokesman, in June 1972.

Wings first performed "Seaside Woman" during the Wings University Tour in February 1972. On July 14, during their Wings Over Europe Tour, a show in France was cancelled, so the band recorded an early version of "Seaside Woman" at EMI Pathé Marconi Studios in Paris. The released version was recorded later by Wings during the Red Rose Speedway sessions in November 1972.

Release
The single was first released five years after the recording, in 1977, on Epic in the US, due to the efforts of Epic's Steve Popovich, who was given label credit for mastering the original single. The B-side, "B-Side to Seaside", was written by Paul and Linda McCartney and recorded by the McCartneys (without Wings) in March 1977. Two years later, "Seaside Woman" was released by A&M Records in the UK in a regular version, which featured diagonal red stripes on the cover and circular ones on the label, and a special "boxed" version with 10 "saucy" seaside-style postcards.  In 1986, a remixed version was released by EMI on 7" and an extended 12" version.

Both sides of the single were later included on Linda McCartney's posthumous album Wide Prairie.

Personnel
Linda McCartney – lead and backing vocals, electric piano
Paul McCartney – harmony and backing vocals, bass guitar
Denny Laine – piano, guitar, backing vocals
Henry McCullough – guitar
Denny Seiwell – drums

Cartoon
"Seaside Woman" was turned into a cartoon short by Oscar Grillo in 1980. It depicts a young Jamaican girl and her loving parents who tend the fishing lines in Jamaica. The film won the Short Film Palme d'Or at the 1980 Cannes Film Festival. The cartoon was released (along with The Oriental Nightfish) on the VHS issue of Rupert and the Frog Song. It was re-released on DVD in 2004 (this time without The Oriental Nightfish) on Tales of Wonder: Music and Animation Classics.

External links
 Linda McCartney - Seaside Woman (Version 1) Official Video
 Linda McCartney - Seaside Woman (Version 2) Official Video
 Paul McCartney & Wings ~ Seaside Woman (Wings Over Europe) 1972

References

1977 singles
1979 singles
A&M Records singles
British reggae songs
Epic Records singles
Music published by MPL Music Publishing
Song recordings produced by Paul McCartney
Songs written by Linda McCartney
Paul McCartney and Wings songs
1972 songs